Minnesota State Highway 108 (MN 108) is a  highway in west-central Minnesota, which runs from its interchange with Interstate Highway 94/US Highway 52 at Prairie View Township near Rothsay and continues east to its eastern terminus at its intersection with State Highway 210 in Henning.

Highway 108 passes through the cities of Pelican Rapids and Henning.

Route description
Highway 108 serves as an east–west and a north–south route between Interstate 94/US Highway 52, Pelican Rapids, Dent, Perham, Ottertail, and Henning in west-central Minnesota.

The roadway changes direction to north–south as it runs concurrent with State Highway 78 for 9 miles between Perham Township and Ottertail.

Highway 108 is also known as:

NW 1st Avenue in Pelican Rapids.
Main Street in Ottertail.
Douglas Avenue in Henning.

Maplewood State Park is located 7 miles east of Pelican Rapids on Highway 108 near Lake Lida.

History
Highway 108 was authorized in 1933 between U.S. 59 at Pelican Rapids and State Highway 78 near Perham. The section of Highway 108 between State Highway 78 at Ottertail and State Highway 210 at Henning was also authorized in 1933. Both of these sections were paved by 1953.

The section of Highway 108 between U.S. 59 at Pelican Rapids and present day Interstate 94 (near Rothsay and Lawndale) was authorized in 1949.  This section of Highway 108 was paved by 1960.

Major intersections

References

108
Transportation in Wilkin County, Minnesota
Transportation in Otter Tail County, Minnesota